St. Xavier's High School, Patna (often abbreviated as SXS Patna or SXHS), is a private Catholic primary and secondary school, located in the neighborhood of Gandhi Maidan in Patna, Bihar, India. Established in 1940, it is the oldest Jesuit school in the city of Patna and in the state of Bihar, established by missionaries from the American Chicago Province of the Society of Jesus. Founded in 1940, it is named after St. Francis Xavier, a Spanish Jesuit saint of the 16th century, who travelled to India. The independent, non-diocesan school is operated by the Patna Province of the Society of Jesus and located in the heart of the city of Patna.

Affiliation
The school is affiliated to the Council for the Indian School Certificate Examinations, New Delhi as well as the Bihar School Examination Board, Patna.

Notable alumni

 Abhayanand, 48th D.G.P of the state of Bihar and famous educationalist
 Arup Roy Choudhury (1972): CMD, National Thermal Power Corporation
 Sandeep Das (1985): Tabla virtuoso
 Sujoy K. Guha (1955): biomedical engineer
 Syed Saba Karim (1982): former wicketkeeper, Indian Cricket Team, Board of Control for Cricket in India selector
 Tejendra Khanna (1954): Lt. Governor of Delhi
 Salman Khurshid (1970): Ex-Minister of External Affairs, Government of India, New Delhi
 Prakash Koirala: Nepalese politician; son of former Nepalese Prime Minister B P Koirala and father of actress Manisha Koirala
 Nikhil Kumar (1955): Governor of Kerala; former IPS officer and Member of Parliament
 Sanjaya Lall (1956): development economist and Professor of Economics, Green College, Oxford University
 Manish Mehrotra (1990): award-winning chef
 Sujit Mukherjee (1944): teacher, author, translator, and publisher
 Jagat Prakash Nadda (1974): National President & Former National General Secretary,BJP & Former Cabinet Minister, Govt of Himachal Pradesh
 Shyam Saran (1961): former Foreign Secretary, Govt. of India
 Vikram Seth: writer
 Arun Kumar Singh (1971): Indian Envoy to France, earlier India's Deputy Ambassador in the US
 N. K. Singh (1956): Member of Rajya Sabha. ex IAS and Former Principal Secretary to the PM 
 Dilip Sinha (1970): Ambassador and Permanent Representative of India to the UN in Geneva
 J. K. Sinha (1961): former Director General of India's Central Reserve Police Force
 Man Mohan Sinha (1948): Air Marshal, Indian Air Force
 Yashvardhan Kumar Sinha (1974): Central Information Commissioner and former Indian High Commissioner to Sri Lanka and the UK
 Shekhar Suman (1972): noted TV and Bollywood film actor and director

See also

 List of Jesuit schools
 List of schools in Patna
 Violence against Christians in India

References

External links

 Official website

Schools in Patna
Christian schools in Bihar
Jesuit primary schools in India
Educational institutions established in 1940
High schools and secondary schools in Bihar
1940 establishments in India
Jesuit secondary schools in India